Vågå is a municipality in Innlandet county, Norway. It is located in the traditional district of Gudbrandsdal. The administrative centre of the municipality is the village of Vågåmo. Other village areas in Vågå include Lalm and Bessheim.

The  municipality is the 73rd largest by area out of the 356 municipalities in Norway. Vågå is the 212th most populous municipality in Norway with a population of 3,591.

General information
The prestegjeld of Vaage was established as a municipality on 1 January 1838 (see formannskapsdistrikt law). On 1 January 1908, the municipality was divided into three parts. The northeastern part of Vågå (population: 2,287) became Sel Municipality, the southeastern part (population: 1,241) became Hedalen Municipality, and the remaining areas in the west (population: 2,953) remained as Vågå municipality. During the 1960s, there were many municipal changes across Norway due to the work of the Schei Committee. On 1 January 1965, the Tolstadåsen area of Vågå (population: 35) was transferred to the neighboring Sel Municipality.

Name
The municipality is named Vågå, since this was the historical name of the Vågå Church parish. Two origins have been suggested for the name Vågå (historic spelling: Vaage):
The name Vågå may come from the Old Norse word vega meaning "travel". The area lies on an ancient east–west route mentioned in the Heimskringla.
The Old Norse form of the name may come from Vaga (accusative and dative cases) from the word Vagi (nominative case). It was probably originally the name of the lake Vågåvatn, but the meaning is unknown. (Maybe derived from vage which means "sleigh runner" since the shape of the lake has some similarity of form with a sleigh runner.)

Prior to 1918, the name was written "Vaage". In 1918, it was changed to "Vaagaa" and in 1921 the spelling was again changed to "Vågå".  The letter å is a long vowel similar to "oh" or "aw", like in the American pronunciation of "cold" or "oar."

Coat of arms
The coat of arms was granted on 23 August 1985. The arms show a gold reindeer on a red background. They are based on a character in Henrik Ibsen's book Peer Gynt, who rides on a reindeer bull over the Besseggen mountains. Ibsen got the idea for this book from a local story.

Churches
The Church of Norway has one parish within the municipality of Vågå. It is part of the Nord-Gudbrandsdal prosti (deanery) in the Diocese of Hamar.

Geography

Vågå is bordered on the north by the municipality of Lesja, in the east by Dovre and Sel, in the southeast by Nord-Fron, in the south by Vang and Øystre Slidre, and in the west by Lom.

Vågå municipality lies in a mountainous region just to the east of Norway's Jotunheimen National Park, west of Rondane National Park, and south of the Dovrefjell mountains. Vågå includes a mountain road to the top of the tall Jetta mountain which provides an unobstructed view of both the Gudbrandsdal valley and the surrounding national parks.

The river Otta begins in Skjåk municipality and flows into Vågåvatn lake. Exiting Vågåvatn at Vågåmo, the river continues its journey through the Ottadalen valley leaving Vågå municipality to meet the Gudbrandsdalslågen river at the town of Otta in the municipality of Sel. Lakes in the region include Flatningen.

Climate
Vågå lies in the rain shadow from the Jotunheimen mountains which separate Eastern and Western Norway. The climate is hence characterized by a continental climate. Warm summers and cold winters dominate, and the precipitation is very low.

This dry continental climate makes Vågå the obvious place for the national hang glider and para glider centre of Norway.

Physical geography
Although being affected by the ice-sheet history spanning the Quaternary period of the last 2.5 million years, much of the landscape are moderately imprinted by ice-sheet erosion except from in the main valleys. Even these valleys including Sjodalen and Ottadalen are of pre-Quaternary origin, and were originally sculptured by fluvial rather than glacial erosion. The numerous lakes does remind us of the glacial history, although being much more limited than in the more dramatic [fiord]s of western Norway.

This limited glacial erosion also means that Vågå had limited glacier erosion during the last glacial period. Many findings of Mammoth pre-dating the last glacial maximum (LGM) have been found, being evidence of the conservative nature of the LGM in the region.

History

Vågå is mentioned in the Heimskringla by Snorri Sturluson. The old Norse saga (Conversion of Dale-Gudbrand) relates that after King Olaf stayed several nights in Lesja, he proceeded south across the uplands to the Ottadal, and the beautiful hamlet lying there on both sides of the Otta river. King Olaf remained there five days, summoning the residents of Vågå, Lom, and Heidal to a meeting (ting). They were advised they must either receive Christianity and give their sons as hostages, or see their habitations burnt. Many submitted to his demands.

Vågå stave church is the second oldest stave church in the country, which was constructed around 1150 and originally dedicated to St. Peter. It was converted to a cruciform church in 1625; the carved portal and wall planks are original. The baptismal font dates from the original church and a Gothic crucifix from the 13th century can be seen there as well.

In 1130, Ivar Gjesling was the earliest-known owner of Sandbu (just north of Vågåmo) in Vågå. He was also King Magnus IV's lendmann for the Opplands. Sigrid Undset's fictional Lady Ragnfrid, wife of Lavrans, was created a Gjesling from Sandbu.  Ivar Gjesling, allied himself with the Birchlegs (Birkebeinerne) — who chose Sverre as their king at Øreting in 1177. Sverre granted him the valley of Heidal as a reward.

Farmers from Vågå participated in the successful attack on Scottish mercenary troops journeying to join Swedish forces in 1612.  The legends of the Battle of Kringen lives on to this day, including the story of how the peasant girl Prillar-Guri lured the Scots into an ambush by playing of the traditional ram's horn.

Ole Paulssøn Haagenstad (1775–1866) was in 1814 summoned by Christian-Frederick to plan the defense of Gudbrandsdalen in the event of a Swedish attack.

Over 150 houses in the municipality are designated as historic landmarks.

Government
All municipalities in Norway, including Vågå, are responsible for primary education (through 10th grade), outpatient health services, senior citizen services, unemployment and other social services, zoning, economic development, and municipal roads.  The municipality is governed by a municipal council of elected representatives, which in turn elects a mayor.  The municipality falls under the Vestre Innlandet District Court and the Eidsivating Court of Appeal.

Municipal council
The municipal council  of Vågå is made up of 17 representatives that are elected to four year terms.  The party breakdown of the council is as follows:

Mayor
The mayor is elected by the municipal council. Since 1946, all mayors with three exceptions have represented the Norwegian Labour Party. The non-Labour mayors were Ola O. Kleiven and Kari Hølmo Holen (Norwegian Centre Party) and Harald Sve Bjørndal who was elected from the local bygdeliste.

Politics

Øygard case
In the September 2011 election, Rune Øygard was reelected as mayor, after having served in that role since 1995. His reelection by the municipal council was controversial as he was already under police investigation for alleged child sexual abuse, the so-called Øygard case, sometimes also referred to as the Vågå case. Øygard was granted temporary leave following his indictment in the case, and was succeeded as acting mayor by Iselin Jonassen (Labour) on 8 May 2012. After being found guilty and sentenced to four years imprisonment, Rune Øygard resigned as mayor. His resignation was granted by the municipal council on 18 December 2012, effective immediately.

Notable residents

 Edvard Storm (1749 in Vågå - 1794) a Norwegian poet, songwriter and educator
 Johan Storm Munch (1778 at Vågå – 1832) a Bishop in the Church of Norway; poet, playwright and magazine editor
 Jo Gjende (1794 in Vågå – 1884) an outdoorsman and freethinker, may have been the model for Henrik Ibsen’s Peer Gynt
 Ole Herman Johannes Krag (1837 in Vågå – 1916) a Norwegian officer and firearms designer
 Ivar Kleiven  (1854 in Vågå - 1934) politician, historian, poet and collector of local folklore
 Kristian Prestgard (1866 in Heidal -1946) an American journalist and author, editor of Decorah-Posten 
 Kristen Holbø (1869 in Vågå – 1953) a painter of landscapes and illustrator 
 Thekla Resvoll (1871 in Vågå – 1948) a Norwegian botanist and educator
 Benjamin Blessum (1877-1954) Norwegian-American painter and illustrator, parents from Vågå
 Ragnvald Skrede (1904 in Vågå - 1983) an author, journalist, literature critic and poet
 Ivar P. Enge (1922 in Vågå – 2013) a Norwegian radiologist, specializing in interventional radiology
 Arne Brimi (born 1957) a Norwegian chef and food writer;  lives and works in Vågå

Sister cities
Vågå has sister city agreements with the following places:
  - Tierps, Uppsala County, Sweden

References

External links

Municipal fact sheet from Statistics Norway 

Map of Vågå municipality in Kulturnett.no 
Vågå Wavecamp

 
Municipalities of Innlandet
1838 establishments in Norway